is a former Japanese football player. He played for Japan national team.

Club career
Fujimoto was born in Ube on October 31, 1977. After graduating from high school, he joined Avispa Fukuoka in 1996. He played many matches in 1998. He moved to Sanfrecce Hiroshima in 1999. The club won second place in the 1999 Emperor's Cup. However the club was relegated to the J2 League in 2002. After that, although he played for Nagoya Grampus Eight in 2003 and Vissel Kobe in 2004, his opportunity to play decreased. In 2005, he moved to Omiya Ardija. He played central player at the club and also served as captain. He moved to Roasso Kumamoto in 2012. He retired at the end of the 2014 season.

National team career
On July 1, 2001, Fujimoto debuted for Japan national team against Paraguay. He played 2 games for Japan in 2001.

Club statistics

National team statistics

References

External links

Japan National Football Team Database

1977 births
Living people
Association football people from Yamaguchi Prefecture
Japanese footballers
Japan international footballers
J1 League players
J2 League players
Avispa Fukuoka players
Sanfrecce Hiroshima players
Nagoya Grampus players
Vissel Kobe players
Omiya Ardija players
Roasso Kumamoto players
Association football midfielders